Sir Thomas Gabriel, 1st Baronet (5 November 1811 – 23 February 1891), was a British timber merchant.

Gabriel was the grandson of Christopher Gabriel, a distinguished plane maker. 

He was a partner of Thomas Gabriel and Sons and Burtons, timber importers and merchants, of Gabriels Wharf. He served as Sheriff of London and Middlesex for 1859–60 and Lord Mayor of London for 1866–67. Soon after his term as Lord Mayor he was created a baronet (of Edgecombe Hall in the County of Surrey), the customary honour given to holders of that office.

Gabriel was buried at West Norwood Cemetery after he died in February 1891, aged 79. The baronetcy died with him.

Gabriel is the great-great-great-uncle of singer-songwriter Peter Gabriel (Sir Thomas Gabriel's brother, Christopher Trowell Gabriel, was Peter Gabriel's great-great-grandfather).

References

1811 births
1891 deaths
Baronets in the Baronetage of the United Kingdom
19th-century lord mayors of London
19th-century English politicians
Burials at West Norwood Cemetery
Sheriffs of the City of London
British merchants
19th-century British businesspeople